Usha is a kibbutz in the western Galilee area of Israel. Located near the city of Kiryat Atta, it falls under the jurisdiction of Zevulun Regional Council.

History
The kibbutz was founded on 9 November 1937 as a tower and stockade settlement by a Polish Jewish gar'in formed in 1930. Prior to the establishment of the kibbutz, they had organised themselves in several moshavot in the Sharon area, including Kfar Saba, Magdiel and Petah Tikva. The founders were members of the Hanoar Hatzioni youth group, and it was the first kibbutz established by the organisation. Its name was taken from the ancient Jewish city of Usha, which remained in the Arab village Hawsha that was located nearby.

During the 1948 Arab–Israeli War Usha and Ramat Yohanan were attacked by the Druze battalion of the Arab Liberation Army, though the residents of the two settlements managed to repel the attack.

References

Kibbutzim
Kibbutz Movement
Populated places established in 1937
Populated places in Haifa District
Polish-Jewish culture in Israel
1937 establishments in Mandatory Palestine